What's Following Me? is Eleanor McEvoy's second studio album and was released in 1996 for Columbia Records. The album is composed of thirteen songs composed by McEvoy. Topics such as alcoholism and Catholicism are explored in depth, but McEvoy's feelings of betrayal are most central to the message of the album. The fourth track on the album, "Precious Little", achieved Top 10 chart success in the US.

Critical reception
Steve Morse of the Boston Globe wrote: "Irish songstress Eleanor McEvoy just keeps getting better. Three years ago she surprised critics by outselling U2 in her homeland with the album, A Woman's Heart. Artistically, the new What's Following Me? is another step forward—a more seamless, more mature glimpse of romantic angst through the eyes of a survivor. McEvoy is an adroit melodist, but she's an even more adroit lyricist who has become a standout in the '90s singer-songwriter field. She can be touchingly vulnerable as in My Own Sweet Bed Tonight, where she sings, "Everyone has their battles and their pain hidden somewhere away." But she also rocks that pain away in The Weatherman and the erotic Biochemistry, where she urges, "Put your lips next to mine." But the show-stopper is Whisper a Prayer to the Moon, in which she tells a lover, "Please bear no grudge, just bare your soul." Good advice."

Track listings

Singles
Whisper a Prayer to the Moon
Precious Little
Whisper a Prayer to the Moon

References

1996 albums
Eleanor McEvoy albums
Columbia Records albums